Marvast County is in Yazd province, Iran. The capital of the county is the city of Marvast. At the 2006 census, the region's population (as Marvast District of Khatam County) was 12,773 in 3,374 households. The following census in 2011 counted 13,948 people in 3,823 households. At the 2016 census, the district's population had increased to 15,150 in 4,518 households. After the census, the district was elevated to the status of Marvast County.

Administrative divisions

The population history and structural changes of Marvast County's administrative divisions (as a district of Khatam County) over three consecutive censuses are shown in the following table.

References

Counties of Yazd Province

fa:شهرستان مروست